The 2020–21 Siena Saints men's basketball team represented Siena College in the 2020–21 NCAA Division I men's basketball season. The Saints, led by second-year head coach Carmen Maciariello, played their home games at the Alumni Recreation Center in Loudonville, New York as members of the Metro Atlantic Athletic Conference. They finished the season 12–5, 12–4 in MAAC play to finish in a tie for first place. As the No. 1 seed in the MAAC tournament, they were upset in the quarterfinals by No. 9 seed Iona 52–55.

Previous season
The Saints finished the 2019–20 season 20–10 overall, 15–5 in MAAC play to finish in first place. As the No. 1 seed in the MAAC tournament, they defeated No. 9 seed Manhattan 63–49 in the quarterfinals. However, the semifinals and championship game, and all postseason tournaments, were cancelled amid the COVID-19 pandemic.

Roster

Schedule and results

|-
!colspan=12 style=| Regular season

|-
!colspan=9 style=|MAAC regular season

|-
!colspan=12 style=| MAAC tournament
|-

|-

Source

References

Siena Saints men's basketball seasons
Siena Saints
Siena Saints men's basketball
Siena Saints men's basketball